Husaberg was a manufacturer of enduro motorcycles with four and two-stroke engines, the displacements ranging from 125 cc to 650 cc. Originally based in Sweden, its motorcycles were later manufactured in Austria by parent company KTM until the line was retired in 2014.

History

Foundation

Husaberg Motor AB was established in 1988 from the circumstances arisen out of the purchase of the motorcycle division of Swedish company Husqvarna by Italian Cagiva in 1987. Cagiva shifted the production of motorcycles to Varese, Italy. A group of engineers led by Thomas Gustavsson decided to stay back in Sweden and continue to work on their project. Husaberg Motor AB was registered in January 1988. The other Husqvarna employees who joined Husaberg were Ruben Helmin (Husqvarna chief engineer and Husaberg's first managing director), Urban Larsson (Husqvarna designer ), Björn Elwin (chief of Husqvarna test department). Roland Söderqwist, a small Swedish mechanical firm owner was also involved in the foundation of the company. The first factory was set up in a woodshed at lake Vättern in the town of Husabergs Udde from which the name of the company is derived.

The name Husaberg was only made official by Gustavsson when entering an enduro race at Skillingaryd, as he was forced to declare the make of his motorcycle.

The Husaberg team tried to compensate for their lack of funds by their courage to rely on technical innovations and could never afford to hire established professional riders but rather ambitious rookies such as Joël Smets, Jimmie Eriksson, Walter Bartolini, Kent Karlsson, Anders Eriksson, Jaroslav Katriňák, Mike Tosswill and Peter Jansson.

Takeover by KTM
Good results on the tracks could not compensate for slow sales, and Husaberg was eventually purchased by the Austrian motorcycle manufacturer KTM in 1995.

Although Husaberg motorcycles have been produced at the KTM factory in Mattighofen, Austria since 2003, and the development department is also at KTM in Mattighofen, the Motorsport department remains in Sweden.

Husaberg's previous slogan, "Ready to Race" was adopted by KTM as its own. Husaberg then adopted the slogan "4 Stroke force" as up until 2012 they only produced four stroke bikes,  and were the leader in 4-stroke performance. Husaberg's current slogan is now "Pure Enduro"

End of the Husaberg brand
In 2014, Husaberg celebrated not only its 25th anniversary but the last year of the brand. In January 2013, Stefan Pierer, The CEO of  KTM-Sportmotorcycle AG a 51% shareholder of KTM AG, purchased 100% stake in Husqvarna AG from BMW through his company Pierer Industrie AG and renamed it to Husqvarna Sportmotorcycle GmbH. Although Husaberg AB and Husqvarna Sportmotocycle GmbH were not merged, it was decided by both KTM and Pierer Industrie that Husaberg brand would cease to exist, citing to reunite what came out of shared roots 25 years ago. Husqvarna will be using Husaberg's technology while keeping the better-known brand name of Husqvarna. The new motorcycles uses the traditional blue, yellow and white colors of Husqvarna.

Reliability
The earlier Husaberg engines (1989–1996) were known to have premature engine failures due to the fact that they do not have an oil pump and rely on oil delivery from the timing chain. The reliability and quality of the engines have improved over the years and, from 1997 on, have been comparable to that of more established brands.

Palmares

Husaberg won the FIM 500 cc Motocross World Championship with Belgian rider Joël Smets in 1995, 1997 and 1998.

They also won 6 Enduro World Championships in 1990, 1991 (2), 1995, 1996 and 1998. Three more Junior Enduro World Championships followed in 2005/2006 by Joakim Ljunggren and in 2009 by Oriol Mena.

Military use
The Swedish military used Husaberg motorcycles, notably for the demonstration team, the Arméns Lejon.

Models

The last lineup included enduro models only. The supermoto, motocross and cross-country (wide ratio gearing, no lighting kit) models were discontinued. The model names are all composed of two letters: "F" as "Four-Stroke" and "T" as "Two-Stroke" both followed by an "E" as in "Enduro" "X for motocross,  "C" for cross country and  "S" for Supermoto. Some older models were also listed with the number of gears: 4 or 6.  Another identifying letter was an "e" suffix indicating the motorcycle had and electric start system e.g., FE 650e.

Various models included different displacements, such as:
650 cc Enduros, Motocross and Supermoto
 550 cc Enduros,  motocross and Supermoto
 501 cc enduro and motocross
 470 cc cross-country
 450 cc enduros,  and motocross
 400 cc enduro
 390 cc enduros and motocross
 350 cc endure

2014 models
They will be offering enduro models only in both two-stroke and four-stroke.  This is the last opportunity to own a pure Husaberg.  All models will have new 25th anniversary graphics.  The 250 four-strokes will be getting an all new engine, new exhaust system and an all new ECU.  All models will be receiving all new suspension settings.  The 4CS USD WP Closed Cartridge forks have been extensively revised.  The 250/350 4-stroke frames have been improved creating a lighter and more nimble frame.  The lower triple clamp has been redesigned to ensure a smoother fork action.  And finally all models will receive a new improved Trail Tech speedo.

4-stroke Enduro:
 FE 250 - 250 cc enduro
 FE 350 - 350 cc enduro
 FE 450 - 450 cc enduro
 FE 501 - 510 cc enduro
Two-stroke Enduro:
 TE 125 - 125 cc two-stroke enduro
 TE 250 - 250 cc two-stroke enduro
 TE 300 - 300 cc two-stroke enduro

2011 models
Besides technical refinements for the existing models, Husaberg is for the first time in its 22-year history offering two-stroke enduro models.

4-stroke Enduro:
 FE 390 - 390 cc enduro
 FE 450 - 450 cc enduro
 FE 570 - 565 cc enduro
4-stroke Motocross:
 FX 450 - 450 cc cross country
Supermoto:
 FS 570 - 565 cc super moto
Two-stroke Enduro:
 TE 250 - 250 cc two-stroke enduro
 TE 300 - 300 cc two-stroke enduro

2010 models
The model lineup for 2010 adds three new models to the program. All models are based on the chassis and engine that was introduced in 2009. The models are:

Enduro:
 FE 390 (new) - 390 cc enduro
 FE 450 - 450 cc enduro
 FE 570 - 565 cc enduro
Motocross/cross country:
 FX 450 (new) - 450 cc Motocross
Supermoto:
 FS 570 (new) - 565 cc super moto

2009 models
For 2009 there are two enduro models available with the new revolutionary engine and a lot of other technical highlights:

Enduro:
 FE 450 - 450 cc enduro with electric start only
 FE 570 - 565 cc enduro with electric start only

2008 Models
The current models for 2008 are as follow:

Enduro:
 FE 450 E - 450 cc enduro with electric start
 FE 550 E - 550 cc enduro with electric start
 FE 650 E - 628 cc enduro with electric start

Supermoto:
 FS 550 E - 550 cc supermoto with electric start
 FS 650 E - 628 cc supermoto with electric start
 FS 650 C - 628 cc supermoto without electric start race only version

2009 Redesign
On November 6, 2007, at the International Motorcycle Exhibition in Milano, Husaberg unveiled a totally new design for the FE 450 E, announced as the 2009 model. Apart from sporting new fairing, the new design included a totally revamped engine, in a new position, rotated 180 degrees from top to bottom, and inclined forward at 70 degrees from vertical. The carburetor was replaced by an EFI injection system and the chain drive was placed on the more standard left side. 

The 70° (09-2012) bikes are considered by Officiandos as the last true Husabergs as, as of 2013 the Husabergs shared the same parts and their KTM sisters.  The revolutionary design is praised by fans, as they believe that the low center of gravity and crank angle aid in finding traction on the power stroke.

References

Motorcycle manufacturers of Austria
Motorcycle manufacturers of Sweden
Austrian brands
Swedish brands